Twelvemile Creek is a tributary of Lake Erie located in Erie County in the U.S. state of Pennsylvania.

Course

Twelvemile Creek joins Lake Erie in Harborcreek Township.

Natural history

Twelvemile Creek is stocked with steelhead by the Pennsylvania Fish Commission. Crayfish, frogs and waterbugs are plentiful. The stream also has many natural small waterfalls made of Pennsylvania Blue stone.

See also
List of rivers of Pennsylvania

References

Rivers of Pennsylvania
Tributaries of Lake Erie
Rivers of Erie County, Pennsylvania